Summer Britcher (born March 21, 1994) is an American luger who earned a place on the Olympic team to compete at the 2014 Winter Olympics . She was the youngest woman on the U.S. Olympic Luge team in Sochi.

Life
Britcher is the daughter of Carrie Britcher and Baltimore City Fire Department Battalion Chief William Britcher. She first became involved in luge at age 11, when she spoke to Gordy Sheer of USA Luge at a promotional/scouting event called the Luge Challenge at the Ski Liberty in Pennsylvania. Sheer suggested she go to Lake Placid for a try-out. Britcher later moved to Lake Placid to train. Britcher attended Susquehannock High School in Glen Rock, Pennsylvania, where she played on the soccer and tennis teams. She graduated from high school in 2012.

Britcher won a gold medal in the team relay at the 2012 Youth Winter Olympics. She placed fifth place in the girls' individual event at those Games. Britcher placed first in the 2013 U.S. Junior National Championship.

References

External links

USA Luge.org profile

 

1994 births
American female lugers
Living people
Lugers at the 2014 Winter Olympics
Lugers at the 2018 Winter Olympics
Lugers at the 2022 Winter Olympics
Olympic lugers of the United States
People from York County, Pennsylvania
Sportspeople from Baltimore
Lugers at the 2012 Winter Youth Olympics
Youth Olympic gold medalists for the United States
21st-century American women